Melville is an unincorporated community in Foster County, North Dakota, United States. Melville was originally named Newport after Northern Pacific Railway treasurer R. M. Newport; its name was changed to Melville for landowner Melville D. Carrington.

References

Unincorporated communities in Foster County, North Dakota
Unincorporated communities in North Dakota